Wally Fraser (18 June 1897 – 10 June 1966) was an Australian rules footballer who played with Essendon and Footscray in the Victorian Football League (VFL).

Notes

External links 
		

1897 births
1966 deaths
Australian rules footballers from Melbourne
Essendon Football Club players
Footscray Football Club (VFA) players
Western Bulldogs players
People from Williamstown, Victoria